White Lines and the Fever:  The Death of DJ Junebug is a 2010 documentary film directed by Travis Gutiérrez Senger.

Festivals
South by Southwest - Austin, Texas
Tribeca Film Festival - New York City, New York 
Seattle International Film Festival - Seattle, Washington
Palm Springs International Film Festival - Palm Springs, California
Rhode Island International Film Festival - Providence, Rhode Island
Bumbershoot Music and Arts Festival - Seattle
Chicago International Film Festival - Chicago, Illinois

Awards
Tribeca Film Festival 2010 - Grand Jury Prize
South by Southwest 2010 - Special Jury Prize
Seattle International Film Festival 2010 - Grand Jury Prize
Rhode Island Film Festival 2010 - Grand Jury Prize

External links
 

2010 films
Documentary films about drugs
Documentary films about hip hop music and musicians
American documentary films
2010 documentary films
2010s English-language films
2010s American films